A Daughter of the Gods was a 1916 American silent fantasy drama film written and directed by Herbert Brenon. The film was controversial because of the sequences of what was regarded as superfluous nudity by the character Anitia, played by Australian swimming star Annette Kellermann. The scene is regarded as the first complete nude scene by a major star, which occurred during a waterfall sequence, though most of Kellerman's body is covered by her long hair.  It was filmed by Fox Film Corporation in Kingston, Jamaica, where huge sets were constructed, and directed by Herbert Brenon.

Background
Brenon served as writer of this original scenario/screenplay for the film. However, he more than likely saw and was influenced by David Belasco and John Luther Long's 1902 Broadway play The Darling of the Gods starring Blanche Bates, Robert T. Haines, and young George Arliss, which has a similar theme of reward for rescuing a child and a large ensemble cast. The play differs in that it is set in feudal Japan while the movie is backdropped in an undersea kingdom, not unlike Atlantis.

Brenon made aspects of the play cinematic (underwater sequences, Kellerman's nudity, etc.) in an obvious effort to avoid charges of plagiarism of Belasco's play and hence a lawsuit.

Plot

A sultan agrees to help an evil witch destroy a mysterious beauty if the witch will bring his young son back to life.

Cast

Production
After receiving the film assignment with its budget limit of $1 million, director Brenon visited the Metropolitan Museum of Art in New York City where he was inspired by paintings such as A Dream of the Arabian Nights by Villegas. The opening scene of the film was claimed to be a composite of Cabanel's The Birth of Venus and Coypel's Venus Frolicking in the Sea with Nymphs.

The film is credited as the first US production to cost at least $1 million ($ in ) to produce, with actual costs just exceeding $1.1 million ($ in ). Studio head William Fox was so incensed with the cost of production he removed Herbert Brenon's name from the film. However, Brenon sued to have his name restored to the film's credits, and won. Advertising for the film would often note its million dollar cost.

Great cost was afforded to make a sanitary of mosquito-proofing over a section of Kingston, Jamaica. Sets consumed  of plaster,  of cement,  of lumber, and ten tons of paper. Director Herbert Brenon employed 20,000 people during the eight months of production and used  of film to shoot the picture. The Moorish city cost $350,000 ($ in ) to build, and was destroyed in one climactic scene. The total number of persons appearing in it was 21,218, which included 200 mermaids, and 300 dancing girls and women of the Sultan's harem. The 100 women recruited from the US and Europe to portray nymphs underwent weeks of training by Kellerman to swim using a single stroke in unison and to avoid unnecessary splashing.

An original score was composed for the film by Robert Hood Bowers, which was played by an orchestra during each screening. It was considered the most memorable film score up to that time.

Reception
The existing film censorship boards in the United States and Canada and the National Board of Review passed the film in spite of its brief nudity scene, calling it artistic. Fox made general distribution of the film for the 1916 December holiday season. President Wilson and his wife, to celebrate their first wedding anniversary, attended the film's December 18, 1916 showing at the Belasco Theater, where it opened in Washington, D.C. Prior to this, the Wilsons had only seen films shown at the White House.

it reportedly made a net profit of $1.35 million.

Preservation
Although stills and publicity photos have survived, A Daughter of the Gods is considered to be a lost film.

See also
List of lost films

Notes

References
 The Picture Show Man entry
 Synopsis (taken from the Library of Congress copyright deposit, with additional material from the film's original program) (Archived 2009-10-23)
 "Kellermann Film Shown at the Lyric; Daughter of the Gods an Elaborate Amphibious Picture for the Submersible Star." The New York Times (October 18, 1916)

External links

1916 films
1910s fantasy drama films
Fox Film films
Films about mermaids
American fantasy drama films
American silent feature films
American black-and-white films
Films directed by Herbert Brenon
Films shot in Jamaica
Lost American films
1916 lost films
Lost fantasy drama films
1916 drama films
1910s American films
Silent American drama films
Silent horror films